The Junta Electoral Central (JEC) is the electoral commission for elections in Spain, monitoring and registering provincial elections, district elections, those of self-governing districts and general elections. It supervises the vote at polling stations.  Its mission is to "ensure the transparency of the electoral process and monitor the performance of the Electoral Census Office."

It is based in Madrid, and was created by Spanish law on 24 March 1977, when the Royal Decree-Law 20/1977 of 18 March, on Electoral Regulations, came into force.

Composition
It comprises eight judges from the Supreme Court of Spain, five active professors of law and sociology, a secretary, and the Director of the Oficina del Censo Electoral, who has a casting vote but is otherwise a sleeping partner.

Presidents
 July 1977: Valentín Silva Melero
 September 1977 - October 1980: Ángel Escudero del Corral
 November 1980 - 1985: Federico Carlos Sainz de Robles y Rodríguez
 1985 - 1987: Paulino Martín Martín
 1987 - 1991: Francisco Tuero Bertrand
 1991 - March 1993: José Hermenegildo Moyna Ménguez
 March 1993 - 1994: Ángel Rodríguez García
 1994 - 1997: Francisco Soto Nieto
 1997 - April 1999: José Luis Albacar López
 April 1999 - 2000: Juan Antonio Xiol Ríos
 2000 - 2004: Enrique Cáncer Lalanne
 2004 - 2008: José María Ruiz-Jarabo Ferrán
 2008 - 2012: Antonio Martín Valverde
 2012 - 2017: Carlos Granados Pérez
 2017 - 2019: Segundo Menéndez Pérez
 2017: Antonio Jesús Fonseca-Herrero Raimundo

References

External links
  

Elections in Spain
Election commissions
1985 establishments in Spain